Murex brevispina ornamentalis is a subspecies of sea snail, a marine gastropod mollusk in the family Muricidae, the murex snails or rock snails.

Description

Distribution

References

External links
 Ponder W.F. & Vokes E.H. (1988) A revision of the Indo-West Pacific fossil and Recent species of Murex s.s. and Haustellum (Mollusca: Gastropoda: Muricidae). Records of the Australian Museum suppl.8: 1-160

Gastropods described in 1988
Murex